Chen Zhi may refer to:

 Chen Zhi (Three Kingdoms) (陳祗) (died 258), official of the Shu Han state during the Three Kingdoms period of China
 Chen Zhi (Ming dynasty) (陳智), Ming dynasty general
 Chen Zhi (businessman) (陈志)
 Chen Zhi (guitarist) (陈志), Chinese guitarist
 Chen Zhi (sinologist) (陳致), Chinese scholar